Ain't Life Amazing is the eighth album from Canadian singer and guitarist Kim Mitchell. The album was released on July 17, 2007.

Track listing
 "Ain't Life Amazing"
 "Rock That Rhyme"
 "I Got a Line on You"
 "Love Overtime"
 "Bad Times"
 "Dreamthieves"
 "Space"
 "In the Stars Tonight"
 "Killer's Name"
 "Lick a Message"
 "N'awlin's Nights"
 "Fill your head with rock" (hidden track)

Resources
http://www.kimmitchell.ca

2007 albums
Kim Mitchell albums